The Ma'in Hot Springs also known as Hammamat Ma'in are a series of hot mineral springs and waterfalls located between Madaba and the Dead Sea in Madaba Governorate, Jordan.

Location
The Ma'in Hot Springs are located 74 km (64 miles) south of Amman in Madaba Governorate and is 27 km away from Madaba. They are located 264 meters (866 feet) below sea level. The region contains a total of 63 springs at different temperatures but similar chemical composition, containing chemical elements and compounds such as sodium, calcium, chloride, radon, hydrogen sulfide, and carbon dioxide. Temperatures in some springs reach 63 degrees Celsius.

Medical tourism
The Ma'in hot springs are considered a medical tourism destination, with visitors seeking treatment for chronic physical ailments such as skin and circulatory diseases, and bone, joint, back and muscular pains. In addition to immersing the body in the springs, foot baths and steam treatments are available. Many come in the winter, due to the region's warm climate.

References

External links

Landforms of Jordan
Madaba Governorate
Hot springs
Dead Sea basin